Cephalium is a frequently brightly coloured structure of wool and bristle at the growing tip of certain cacti. It is most commonly found on cacti of the genus Melocactus and can take a number of colours, forms and shapes.
The cephalium will only begin growing after a cactus has reached a certain size or age. Once flowering begins the flower buds will form from the cephalium.

References

External links 

 http://www.cactus-art.biz/note-book/Dictionary/Dictionary_C/dictionary_cephalium.htm

Cacti
Plant morphology